Stefan Wyszyński (3 August 1901 – 28 May 1981) was a Polish prelate of the Catholic Church. He served as the bishop of Lublin from 1946 to 1948, archbishop of Warsaw and archbishop of Gniezno from 1948 to 1981. He was created a cardinal on 12 January 1953 by Pope Pius XII. He assumed the title of Primate of Poland.

The case for his beatification and canonization opened in 1989 (he had the title of Servant of God when the cause commenced) and has many proponents in the Vatican and in his native Poland, where he is well known for his stands against both National Socialism and Communism, and because of his connections to Pope John Paul II (he played a key role in urging Cardinal Wojtyła to accept his election as pope). Pope Francis named him as Venerable on 18 December 2017 upon confirming his heroic virtue. He was scheduled to be beatified in Warsaw on 7 June 2020 but the beatification was delayed because of the COVID-19 pandemic. It was rescheduled and celebrated on 12 September 2021.

To many he was the unquestionable spiritual leader of the Polish nation, in opposition to the totalitarian communist government. He is also credited for the survival of Polish Christianity in the face of its repression and persecution during the reign of the 1945–1989 Communist regime. He himself was imprisoned for three years, and is considered by many to be one of Poland's national heroes.

Early life and ordination
Wyszyński was born in the village of Zuzela in eastern Mazovia on the Bug River. During the Partitions of Poland, this area was part of the Russian Empire (more specifically, Congress Poland) until the end of the First World War. The Wyszyński family counted itself among the nobility of Poland (the szlachta), with the coat of arms of Trzywdar and the title of baron, although it was not materially well off.

Wyszyński's mother died when he was nine. In 1912, his father sent him to Warsaw. In the years 1914–1916 Stefan attended the high-school in Łomża. The following year he enrolled in the seminary in Włocławek, and on his 23rd birthday (3 August 1924), after being hospitalised with a serious illness, he received his priestly ordination from Bishop Wojciech Stanisław Owczarek.

Priest and professor
Wyszyński celebrated his first Solemn High Mass of Thanksgiving, at Jasna Góra in Częstochowa, a place of special spiritual significance for many Catholic Poles. The Pauline monastery there holds the picture of the Black Madonna, or Our Lady of Częstochowa, the patron saint and guardian of Poland. Wyszyński spent the next four years in Lublin, where in 1929 he received a doctorate at the Faculty of Canon Law and the Social Sciences of the Catholic University of Lublin. His dissertation in Canon Law was entitled The Rights of the Family, Church and State to Schools. For several years after graduation he traveled throughout Europe, where he furthered his education.

After returning to Poland, Wyszyński began teaching at the seminary in Włocławek. When the Second World War broke out with the German invasion of Poland in 1939, he was forced to leave Włocławek because he was wanted by the Gestapo: he had written articles critical of the Nazis in a Catholic journal. At the request of Bishop Kozal, he went to Laski near Warsaw. When the Warsaw Uprising broke out on 1 August 1944, he adopted the nom de guerre "Radwan II" and became chaplain of the insurgents' hospital in Laski, and of the Żoliborz military district of the Armia Krajowa, the Polish underground resistance organisation.

During the Nazi occupation of Poland, Wyszyński aided several Jews. While there, Wyszyński and another man helped hide a Jewish widower and his two children - who would later be denounced by a Ukrainian nationalist and killed by the Germans - in an attic. Additionally, Esther Grinberg, in her testimony held at the Yad Vashem Institute in Jerusalem, mentions twice that she survived the Holocaust rescued by Poles who hid her after Wyszyński had implored them, in veiled language of a sermon, to save Jews "running from the fire of war".

In 1945, a year after the end of war in the area, Wyszyński returned to Włocławek, where he started a restoration project for the devastated seminary, becoming its rector as well as the chief editor of a Catholic weekly.

Bishop
Just a year later, on 25 March 1946, Pope Pius XII appointed him Bishop of Lublin; he was consecrated by Cardinal August Hlond on 12 May that year. After Hlond's death on 22 October 1948, he was named Archbishop of Gniezno and Warsaw, and thus Primate of Poland, on 12 November 1948. As the cardinal lay dying, he had asked that Wyszyński's name be forwarded to Rome as a potential replacement.

Post-war resistance to Communism

World War II ended in 1945; however, beginning in the eastern portion of present-day Poland, and later in the west, hostilities continued for several years between a large segment of Poles and the Stalinist government. The Catholic Church hoped for the return of the Polish government-in-exile from London and the removal of Stalin's puppet regime; it actively supported the anti-Communists. One of the prime issues was the confiscation of church property by the Communist government. In 1950, Wyszyński decided to enter into a secret agreement with the Communist authorities, which was signed on 14 April 1950 by the Polish episcopate and the government. The agreement settled the political disputes of the church versus the government in Poland. It allowed the church to hold onto "reasonable" property, separated the church from politics, and even allowed authorities to select a bishop from a list of three candidates.

Beginning in 1953, another wave of persecution swept Poland. When the bishops continued their support for anti-Communist resistance, the government began holding mass trials and imprisoning priests, including Wyszyński, who had just been made cardinal. On 25 September 1953 he was imprisoned at Rywałd, and later placed under house arrest in  near Lidzbark Warmiński, in Prudnik near Opole and in the Komańcza monastery in the Bieszczady Mountains. While imprisoned, he observed the brutal torture and mistreatment of detainees, some of it highly perverse in nature. He was released on 26 October 1956 following Polish October.

Cardinal and Primate of Poland

On 12 January 1953, Wyszyński was elevated to the rank of cardinal by Pope Pius XII, but it was not until 18 May 1957 that he was designated Cardinal-Priest of Santa Maria in Trastevere.

He never stopped his religious and social work. Its crowning achievement was the celebration of Poland's Millennium of Christianity in 1966 – the thousandth anniversary of the baptism of Poland's first historical ruler, Mieszko I. During the celebration, the Communist authorities refused to allow Pope Paul VI to visit Poland and they also prevented Cardinal Wyszyński from attending celebrations abroad. Wyszyński triumphed in 1978, when Karol Wojtyła of Kraków was elected Pope John Paul II, followed by a spectacular papal visit to Poland in 1979. Wyszyński did not turn a blind eye towards the civil unrest in 1980. When the Solidarity trade union was created in Poland, he appealed to both sides, the government as well as the striking workers, to act responsibly.

Cardinal Wyszyński, often called the Primate of the Millennium, died on 28 May 1981 at the age of 79 of abdominal cancer. He is buried in St. John's Archcathedral in Warsaw. The cardinal, who had heard of the assassination attempt on the pope, offered his own life for that of the pontiff's.

To commemorate the twentieth anniversary of his death, the year 2001 was announced by the Sejm as the Year of Cardinal Stefan Wyszyński. The Sejm also honoured the Cardinal as a "great Pole, chaplain and statesman".

Legacy

In 1981 Krzysztof Penderecki composed the Agnus Dei of his Polish Requiem in his memory. In 2000, a motion picture was made about the life and imprisonment of Wyszyński. The Primate – Three Years Out of a Thousand was directed by Teresa Kotlarczyk. The title role was played by Andrzej Seweryn.

In the CBS miniseries Pope John Paul II (based on the life of the Polish pope), Cardinal Wyszyński was portrayed by English actor Christopher Lee.

Cardinal Stefan Wyszyński University in Warsaw, earlier the Warsaw Theological Academy, was renamed for him. The Museum of John Paul II and Primate Wyszyński is being constructed at the Temple of Divine Providence in Warsaw.

In 2022, another motion picture of Wyszyński's life was made. Prophet, was directed by Michal Kondrat. The title role was played by Slawomir Grzymkowski.

Beatification

The official "nihil obstat" was declared for the late cardinal on 26 April 1989 at the behest of Pope John Paul II. This gave Wyszyński the title of Servant of God and was the first step on the road to sainthood. The diocesan process of the cause commenced on 29 May 1989 and it concluded its business on 6 February 2001; the process was ratified by the Congregation for the Causes of Saints on 8 February 2002 in Rome. The Positio was assembled and was submitted to the Congregation for the Causes of Saints in November 2015 in which documents were submitted to the Cardinal Prefect Angelo Amato from Cardinal Kazimierz Nycz.

Theologians met to discuss the contents of the Positio on 26 April 2016 and voted in favor of the late cardinal's life of heroic virtue. It must be passed onto the members of the C.C.S. before receiving papal approval. The C.C.S. cardinal and bishop members voted and approved the cause in their meeting on 12 December 2017. Pope Francis confirmed his heroic virtue on 18 December 2017 and titled the late cardinal as Venerable.

An investigation on a diocesan level was initiated on 27 March 2012 for an alleged miracle attributed to him which concluded its business on 28 May 2013; the process was validated on 10 October 2014. The documentation proceeded from that point to Rome for further evaluation, but this evaluation could only take place upon the declaration of his heroic virtue (this happened in 2017 allowing for the miracle to be further assessed). The medical experts in Rome approved the miracle on 29 November 2018 with theologians later confirming it as well as the cardinals and bishops comprising the Congregation on 24 September 2019.

On 3 October 2019, the Congregation for the Causes of the Saints officially approved the miracle, the last step to his beatification after the Congregation's members themselves approved the miracle on 24 September. The beatification was scheduled to take place in Warsaw on 7 June 2020 but was delayed because of the COVID-19 pandemic. The beatification was re-scheduled and celebrated on 12 September 2021 with Cardinal Marcello Semeraro presiding on the Pope's behalf.

See also
 Letter of Reconciliation of the Polish Bishops to the German Bishops

Bibliography

Czaczkowska E., Kardynał Wyszyński, Świat Książki, Warszawa 2009, ;
Micewski A., Kardynał Wyszyński. Prymas i mąż stanu, Éditions du Dialogue, Paris 1982, ;
Romaniuk M.P., Prymas Wyszyński. Biografia i wybrane źródła, Gaudentinum, Gniezno 2001, ;
Szeloch H., Rodzina wobec pomocniczości i dobra wspólnego w nauczaniu społecznym Stefana Kardynała Wyszyńskiego – Prymasa Polski, PWT Wrocław 1988.

References

Books
Love and Social Justice: Reflections on Society, Arouca Press, 2021

External links
 Rooney, David M., Religion and nationalism in Soviet and East European politics, National Review; 11/7/1986.
 Virtual tour Gniezno Cathedral  
List of Primates of Poland 

|-

|-

1901 births
1981 deaths
People from Ostrów Mazowiecka County
People from Łomża Governorate
20th-century Polish cardinals
Cardinals created by Pope Pius XII
Participants in the Second Vatican Council
Archbishops of Gniezno
Archbishops of Warsaw
Warsaw Uprising insurgents
Polish Servants of God
Deaths from stomach cancer
Burials at St. John's Archcathedral, Warsaw
20th-century venerated Christians
People detained by the Polish Ministry of Public Security
Venerated Catholics by Pope Francis
Beatifications by Pope Francis
Deaths from cancer in Poland
Recipients of the Order of the White Eagle (Poland)